El Dios de barro (English title:The God of Clay) is a Mexican telenovela produced by Televisa and transmitted by Telesistema Mexicano in 1970.

Cast 
Rosario Granados
Raúl Ramírez
Adriana Roel
Héctor Andremar
Carlos Ancira

References

External links 

Mexican telenovelas
1970 telenovelas
Televisa telenovelas
Spanish-language telenovelas
1970 Mexican television series debuts
1970 Mexican television series endings